Frederick Charles Henry (December 14, 1929 – October 16, 2013) was a Canadian cyclist. He competed in the 1,000 metres time trial event at the 1952 Summer Olympics.

References

External links
 

1929 births
2013 deaths
Canadian male cyclists
Olympic cyclists of Canada
Cyclists at the 1952 Summer Olympics
Sportspeople from Toronto
20th-century Canadian people
21st-century Canadian people